Argyresthia quercicolella is a moth of the  family Yponomeutidae. It is found in North America, including Colorado.

The wingspan is about 10 mm. The forewings are silvery white, largely suppressed by extensive golden-yellow markings. The hindwings are light fuscous.

The larvae possibly feed on Quercus species.

References

Moths described in 1877
Argyresthia
Moths of North America